Point Grey stəywəte:n̓ Secondary School, previously called Point Grey Secondary School, is a public secondary school located in the Kerrisdale and Shaughnessy neighbourhoods of Vancouver, British Columbia, Canada.

History
Designed by Fred Townley and Matheson, the main building was built in 1929 in a Collegiate Gothic style. Construction of the school was commissioned by the Municipality of Point Grey prior to amalgamation with the City of Vancouver. Point Grey Secondary was built originally as a junior high school. The first students began classes in September 1929 and the building served as a junior high school until 1965 when it became a full secondary school. In 1965, a new wing was added with a gym, laboratories and a library. In 2006, Point Grey, in conjunction with the Parks Board, completed a new artificial turf field, and have upgraded the track surrounding it to a rubber surface.
Point Grey also offers Advanced Placement courses in Biology, Calculus, Chemistry, Computer Science, English, Physics, and Psychology.

In 1962 Point Grey was designated a comprehensive secondary school from grade 8 to 12, as it is today. Although the school offered a full range of courses, its focus was essentially academic. Today eighty-five per cent of Point Grey's grade 12's continue on with post-secondary education.

Feeder schools
For the most part, Point Grey Secondary School receives students from three elementary schools. These include Kerrisdale Elementary School, Quilchena Elementary School, and Southlands Elementary School. However, students also enroll from Talmud Torah, Emily Carr Elementary School, St. Augustine's Elementary School, Shaughnessy Elementary School, General Wolfe Elementary School, L'École Bilingue, Jules Quesnel Elementary School and also from many other private and public schools in the region and all over the Vancouver area and out of boundary.

Campus
The main building, (the original building) contains most of the school's classrooms, a cafeteria, Foods and Sewing Room on the first floor. The Second floor, contains the office, the Library, the Auditorium, Band room, Small Gym, Boys and Girls Gym. Most Math and Art, and Tech classes are on this floor. The third floor, has classes for English, French, Spanish, Japanese, Social Studies. There is also a Science Wing which contains 7 classrooms. There is also a Drama room, Woodworks shop, and a "Math" wing, which no longer houses any math class.

Point Grey Mini School

Founded in 1979, the mini school is a district-wide program that offers students enriched learning and social experiences in addition to the regular curriculum. Unlike the main school, all students who wish to enter the mini school program must write an entrance exam (regardless of whether or not they are in the catchment zone), and out of the many who apply, only twenty-eight individuals (14 girls and 14 boys) are chosen. Students are still considered part of the main school and take elective courses there. The head teacher position is currently shared by Mr. Paul Skarsgard and Mr. Mori Hamilton. The students go on a variety of trips listed below:
Grade Eight: Orientation, Manning Park Ski Trip, and Bamfield Marine Station.
Grade Nine and Ten: Orientation, Manning Park Ski Trip, Oregon Shakespeare Festival in Ashland, Oregon, USA or Strathcona Park Lodge
Grade Eleven and Twelve: Orientation, Manning Park Ski Trip (optional)

Sports
There is a wide variety of extracurricular sports are offered throughout the year such as soccer, volleyball and skiing.

 Fall season
Cross country running, girls' field hockey, boys' rugby, boys' premier soccer, Junior soccer, swimming, girls' volleyball, junior and senior boys volleyball

 Winter season
Wrestling, snowboarding, skiing, ice hockey and basketball for boys and girls.

 Spring season
Girls' soccer, bantam and juvenile boys volleyball, track and field, girls' rugby, ultimate, softball, golf for boys and girls, tennis and badminton.

In popular culture
The film Superbad was based on the experiences of the film's writers Seth Rogen and Evan Goldberg when they attended Point Grey. The duo's production company, Point Grey Pictures is named after it.
Fox's Lucifer was filmed there: the school doubled as a Korean community centre for the series. 
The CW teen drama series Riverdale is also filmed here, on the sports field beside the schools, in the auditorium, and in the hallway.
High school scenes from the movie To All the Boys I've Loved Before and To All the Boys: P.S. I Still Love You were filmed here.
Other productions include the third adaptation of Mostly Ghostly and TV movies One Night In Doom House starring Corey Fogelmanis

Notable alumni

References

External links
 Point Grey Secondary School website
 Vancouver School Board - Point Grey

High schools in Vancouver
Educational institutions established in 1929
Gothic Revival architecture in Vancouver
1929 establishments in British Columbia